Joshua Randol Fleming (born May 18, 1996) is an American professional baseball pitcher for the Tampa Bay Rays of Major League Baseball (MLB). He made his MLB debut in August 2020.

Amateur career
Fleming attended Columbia High School in Columbia, Illinois, where he pitched for the Eagles.

Professional career
Fleming was drafted by the Tampa Bay Rays in the fifth round of the 2017 MLB draft out of Webster University. He signed and made his debut with the Princeton Rays, that year. Fleming's 2017 stat line included a 5.40 earned run average (ERA) across 12 games (nine starts). In 2018, Fleming began the season with the Bowling Green Hot Rods, where he posted a 1.20 ERA over ten games. Fleming began pitching for the Charlotte Stone Crabs in July, achieving a record of 3–3 with a 4.11 ERA. In posting a 2019 season record that included a 3.31 ERA over 21 games, Fleming was named the MVP of the season by the Montgomery Biscuits . He finished the season with the Durham Bulls, compiling a 5.14 ERA across four games.

In July 2020, the Rays added Fleming to their 60-man roster. On August 21, after Rays starter Yonny Chirinos was ruled out for the rest of the 2020 season with a torn UCL, Kevin Cash announced Fleming would be called up to make his debut on August 23, against the Toronto Blue Jays. His contract was officially selected to the active roster on August 23. Fleming earned the win in his big league debut, pitching five innings with three strikeouts and two earned runs in a 5–4 Rays victory. He finished the season with a 5–0 record and a 2.78 ERA in  innings.

Personal life
Fleming and his wife, Katie, met at Webster (where she played volleyball) and were married in St. Louis in November 2020.

References

External links

1996 births
Living people
Baseball players from Missouri
Bowling Green Hot Rods players
Charlotte Stone Crabs players
Durham Bulls players
Major League Baseball pitchers
Montgomery Biscuits players
People from St. Louis County, Missouri
Princeton Rays players
Tampa Bay Rays players